Bills Creek may refer to:

Bills Creek (Current River tributary), a stream in Missouri
Bills Creek (West Fork Black River tributary), a stream in Missouri
Bills Creek (Sugar Creek), a stream in West Virginia